Ceratodacus priscus is a species of prehistoric fly, which probably belongs in the family Tephritidae. It is known from a single male fossil, preserved in Dominican amber from the El Mamey Formation of the Cordillera Septentrional. The species is characterised by the presence of long setulae on the arista.

References

Blepharoneurinae
Insects described in 2000
Prehistoric insects of the Caribbean
Neogene insects